A. glutinosa  may refer to:
 Alnus glutinosa, the black alder, European alder or common alder, a tree species native to most of Europe
 Arctostaphylos glutinosa, the Schreiber's manzanita, a plant species endemic to Santa Cruz County, California
 Aristeguietia glutinosa, the matico, a flowering plant species found only in Ecuador

See also
 Glutinosa